The 2009 Tequila Patrón American Le Mans Series at Long Beach was the third round of the 2009 American Le Mans Series season.  It took place at the Long Beach street circuit, California on April 18, 2009.

The de Ferran Motorsports Acura team earned their first victory in the series, leading the Highcroft Racing Acura to the finish.  Fernández Racing Acura also won the LMP2 category for their third straight race while the #4 Chevrolet Corvette of Oliver Gavin and Olivier Beretta won Corvette Racing's final appearance in the GT1 category in the American Le Mans Series.  Flying Lizard Motorsports won their second straight GT2 class victory after early leader Farnbacher-Loles suffered a suspension failure on circuit.

Report

Qualifying

Qualifying result
Pole position winners in each class are marked in bold.

† – The #62 Risi Competizione Ferrari's times were not allowed as the car failed post-qualifying inspection due to being below the minimum ride height.

Race

Race results
Class winners in bold.  Cars failing to complete 70% of winner's distance marked as Not Classified (NC).

References

Long Beach
Grand Prix of Long Beach
American Le Mans